"Anna mä meen" is a song by Finnish rapper Cheek. The song features an appearance by a singer Jonne Aaron. The song serves as the fourth single from Cheek's seventh studio album Sokka irti. The song peaked at number one on the Finnish Singles Chart in December 2012.  A music video, directed by Petri Lahtinen, was uploaded to YouTube in October 2012.

Chart performance

References

2012 songs
2012 singles
Cheek (rapper) songs
Finnish-language songs
Number-one singles in Finland
Warner Music Group singles